Roman Shin is a deputy in the Jogorku Kenesh, the parliament of Kyrgyzstan, and a member of the Ata-Zhurt party.  He is member of  the minority Korean ethnic group. Roman Shin has been a Member of Parliament since 2005. Since his reelection to the Jogorku Kenesh in 2010, he sits as a member of Ata-Zhurt (Fatherland) in that body.

References

Living people
Members of the Supreme Council (Kyrgyzstan)
Kyrgyzstani politicians of Korean descent
Year of birth missing (living people)